"On the Beach" is a 1964 hit song by Cliff Richard and the Shadows. It was taken from and released in the lead up to the release of the film Wonderful Life and its soundtrack. It become an international hit for Richard, reaching number 7 in the UK Singles Chart and charting in Australia (No. 4), Ireland (No. 6), Norway (No. 4), South Africa (No. 2) and Sweden (No. 12).

Track listing
7": Columbia / DB 7305
 "On the Beach" – 2:58
 "A Matter of Moments" – 2:56

Personnel
 Cliff Richard – vocals
 Hank Marvin – lead guitar, backing vocals
 Bruce Welch – rhythm guitar, backing vocals
 Brian Locking – bass guitar
 Brian Bennett – drums

Chart performance

References

Cliff Richard songs
Columbia Graphophone Company singles
1964 singles
1964 songs
Songs written by Hank Marvin
Songs written by Bruce Welch
Songs about beaches